is a Japanese badminton player from the Unisys team. In 2010, he competed at the Guangzhou Asian Games.

Achievements

BWF Grand Prix 
The BWF Grand Prix has two level such as Grand Prix and Grand Prix Gold. It is a series of badminton tournaments, sanctioned by Badminton World Federation (BWF) since 2007.

Men's Doubles

 BWF Grand Prix Gold tournament
 BWF Grand Prix tournament

BWF International Challenge or Series
Men's singles

Men's doubles

 BWF International Challenge tournament
 BWF International Series tournament

References

External links 
 

1987 births
Living people
Sportspeople from Ehime Prefecture
Japanese male badminton players
Badminton players at the 2010 Asian Games
Asian Games competitors for Japan
21st-century Japanese people